Thatayaone Ditlhokwe (born 21 September 1998) is a Motswana professional footballer playing as a defender for SuperSport United and captains the Botswana national team. He is a full Botswana international, having made eight appearances and scored two goals since his debut on June 1, 2018.

International career

International goals
Scores and results list Botswana's goal tally first.

Honours
 Township Rollers
 Botswana Premier League: 1
2018-19

References

1998 births
Living people
Place of birth missing (living people)
Botswana footballers
Association football defenders
Gaborone United S.C. players
Township Rollers F.C. players
SuperSport United F.C. players
Botswana international footballers
Botswana expatriate footballers
Expatriate soccer players in South Africa
Botswana expatriate sportspeople in South Africa